The 1978 New York City Marathon was the 9th edition of the New York City Marathon and took place in New York City on 22 October.

Results

Men

Women

References

External links

New York City Marathon, 1978
Marathon
New York City Marathon
New York